Charles Rondeau was a 19th-century French playwright. Often signing his participations Charles, his plays were presented on numerous Parisian stages of the 19th century including the Théâtre de la Gaîté, the Théâtre du Vaudeville, and the Théâtre des Variétés.

Works 
1813: La Coutume écossaise ou Le Mariage sur la frontière, comédie en vaudeville in 1 act, with Alexandre de Ferrière
1819: Cadet Butteux, électeur à Lyon, vaudeville politique, with Victor Ducange
1829: Les Petits braconniers, ou la Capitulation, comedy in 1 act, mingled with couplets, with Nicolas Brazier and Jean-Toussaint Merle
1829: Les Ricochets, one-act comedy de Picard, set in couplets and arranged for the Théâtre Comte
1830: Madame Grégoire ou Le cabaret de la Pomme de pin, comédie en vaudeville in 2 acts, with Edmond Rochefort and Charles Dupeuty
1836: La Grue, fabliau mêlé de chant, with de Ferdinand de Villeneuve and Charles de Livry
1837: La fille de Dominique, comédie vaudeville en un acte, with de Villeneuve

19th-century French dramatists and playwrights
Year of birth missing
Year of death missing